Las Lomitas is a city in northern Argentina. It is located in the Patiño Department in the center of Formosa Province.

It is served by Alférez Armando Rodríguez Airport.

Climate
Las Lomitas has a humid subtropical climate (Köppen climate classification Cwa), similar to other areas in the Chaco region. Winters are characterized with mild to warm temperatures during the day and cool nights and are dry. Temperatures can occasionally fall below freezing during cold waves although during heat waves, temperatures can reach above . In an average winter, Las Lomitas receives 8.5 days of frost per year while the first and last dates of frost are 28 June and 29 July respectively. Spring and fall are transition seasons and are rather short featuring hot daytime temperatures and mild nighttime temperatures. Frosts are rare in these seasons and temperatures may exceed . Summers are hot, long and very humid, owing to most of the precipitation occurring during this season. During the most extreme heat waves, the temperature can reach above . The average relative humidity is 67%, with the late summer and fall months being more humid than the winter months. On average, Las Lomitas receives  of precipitation per year with 86 days with measureable precipitation with summer months being more wetter than the winter months, where most of the precipitation falls in the form of thunderstorms. Las Lomitas receives approximately 2,717.0 hours of bright sunshine per year or 60% of possible sunshine per year, ranging from a low of 51% in June (only 162.0 hours of sunshine per month) to a high of 68% in February.

References

Populated places in Formosa Province
Cities in Argentina
Argentina
Formosa Province